Daesong Group is an important North Korean trading and holding company. Among other holdings it owns Daesong Bank.

The headquarters is at Pulgan Gori Dong 1,  Pyongyang City, Potonggang District, North  Korea.

References

Financial services companies of North Korea